Dominic Inglot and Matt Reid were the defending champions but chose not to defend their title.

Roman Jebavý and Philipp Oswald won the title after defeating Hugo Nys and Jan Zieliński 7–6(8–6), 3–6, [10–3] in the final.

Seeds

Draw

References

External links
 Main draw

Andalucía Challenger - Men's Doubles